Farmersville High School (abbr. FHS) is a public American senior high school set in Farmersville, California, United States.  The school is part of the Farmersville Unified School District, which takes in the majority of students from its K-8 program.

Academics
As of the 2005/2006 school year, all students enrolled at FHS must at least meet the following criteria before graduation:

4 years of English (40 credits)
3 years of Math (30 credits) [10 of the math credits must be the completion of Algebra 1B or the equivalent of Algebra 1]
2 years of P.E. (20 credits)
1 year of Frosh Studies (10 credits)
1 year of World History (10 credits)
1 year of U.S. History (10 credits)
1 year of Government/Economics (10 credits)
1 year of Physical Science (10 credits)
1 year of Life Science (10 credits)
1 year of Fine Arts (10 credits)
1 year of Foreign Language (10 credits)
1 year of keyboarding (10 credits)
120 credits of electives

In total, 300 credits are necessary for a student at FHS to graduate.  Also, starting with the 2007/2008 school year, freshman through senior year is used to calculate the cumulative high school GPA.  Prior to this move, sophomore through senior year factored into the overall student GPA at FHS.

Athletics
FHS sports teams are called the Aztecs, and have their home games on campus.  The Aztecs participate in the East Sierra League (Div. VI, CIF Central Section) and have varsity, JV, and frosh/soph teams.  Below are all the sports that FHS participates in and their respective season:

Fall
Cross Country
Women's Volleyball
Football
Winter
Men's Basketball
Women's Basketball
Men's Soccer
Women's Soccer
Wrestling
Spring
Baseball
Softball
Track & Field
An aquatics program will be introduced following the construction of the new aquatic center.

Clubs and organizations
Every year, FHS has the following clubs and organizations that students can participate in:

ASB
Art Club
Avid Club
Band / Color guard
Representatives for each class:
President
Vice-President
Secretary
Treasurer 
Choir
CSF
Dance Club
Drama
FFA
Key Club
Pep Squad
Spanish Club
Theatre
Yearbook

References

High schools in Tulare County, California
Public high schools in California